The Settlers High School is a public English medium co-educational high school situated in Bellville which is in the Western Cape province of South Africa. The high school was established in 1965.

History

The School was started on 19 January 1965. ET Hobbs was the Headmaster. The School recognise the British heritage in its naming of its houses: Pringle, Bain and Shaw. These three were 1820 Settlers from Britain to South Africa.

Awards

Settlers received the Provincial Excellence in English Home Language Award, from The Premier Helen Zille and Education Minister Donald Grant. This is awarded for the school with the highest number of passes in English Home Language.

Events

The school buildings were officially opened on 24 April 1969. On 23 October 1990, the parents of the school voted for the school to be opened to all races.

Alumni
 Annette Cowley - Retired South African Swimmer. 
 Neil de Kock, Scrumhalf for the Springboks rugby team in 2001.

References

Schools in Cape Town
High schools in South Africa
Schools in the Western Cape
1965 establishments in South Africa
Educational institutions established in 1965